The Elite 25, also called the Feeling 720 NV, is a French trailerable sailboat that was designed by Michel Joubert of Joubert-Nivelt as a cruiser and first built in 1982.

Production
The design was built by Kirié in France between 1982 and 1987, with 260 boats completed. Feeling 720 NV production continued until 1992, but it is now out of production.

Design
The Elite 25 is a recreational keelboat, built predominantly of single skin polyester fiberglass, with wood trim. It has a fractional sloop rig with aluminum spars and wire standing rigging, with a deck-stepped mast and a single set of unswept spreaders. The hull has a raked stem, a plumb transom, a transom-hung rudder controlled by a tiller and a fixed fin keel or keel and a steel centerboard.

The boat is fitted either a inboard engine or a small  outboard motor for docking and maneuvering.

The design has sleeping accommodation for four people, with a double "V"-berth in the bow and an aft cabin with a double berth on the port side. The galley is located on the port side just forward of the companionway ladder. The galley is "L"-shaped and is equipped with a two-burner stove, a  icebox and a sink. The head is located amidships on the starboard side.

Variants
Elite 25 fin keel
This model displaces  and carries  of cast iron ballast.
Elite 25 keel and centerboard
This model displaces  and carries  of ballast.

Operational history
In a 2010 review Steve Henkel wrote, "best features: The boats included good quality materials (aluminum ports and hatches, teak and holly cabin soles, varnished elm interiors, teak cockpit seats). PHRF of 201 signifies good speed versus comps. Worst features: Fabric cabin liners were not up to an otherwise good standard of quality."

See also
List of sailing boat types

References

Keelboats
1980s sailboat type designs
Sailing yachts
Trailer sailers
Sailboat type designs by Joubert-Nivelt
Sailboat types built by Kirié